Run with the Devil is a 1960 Italian comedy-drama film directed by Mario Camerini.

Cast 

Antonella Lualdi as Donata
Gérard Blain as  Stefano
Franco Fabrizi as Giosuè
Cristina Gaioni as  Marisa
Yvonne Furneaux as  Marta
Claudio Gora as  Pippo Cantigliani
Corrado Pani as Youth 
Spiros Focás as Marco Belli 
Alex Nicol as Bill Rogers 
Marion Marshall as Grace 
Franco Giacobini    
Gabriella Giorgelli

References

External links

1960 films
1960 comedy-drama films
Italian comedy-drama films
Films directed by Mario Camerini
1960s Italian-language films
1960s Italian films